is a 2015 Japanese science fiction action film based on the novel of the same name by Takayoshi Honda. It was directed by Takahisa Zeze, who is known for Heaven's Story (2010). The film was released on June 27, 2015.

Cast
 Masaki Okada as Subaru
 Shōta Sometani as Manabu
 Riko Narumi as Saya
 Mayu Matsuoka as Momo
 Hiroya Shimizu as Ryosuke
 Toshiki Seto as Ryuji
Nobuyuki Suzuki as Sou
 Shuntarou Yanagi as Hide
 Shunya Shiraishi as Wataru
 Sara Takatsuki as Shizuka
 Yuina Kuroshima as Aoi
 Tuyoshi Ihara as Watase
 Renji Ishibashi as Oosone
 Kousuke Toyohara as Isaka

Reception
The film has grossed  at the Japanese box office.

References

External links
 
Official website on Nippon Television

2015 films
2010s Japanese films
2010s Japanese-language films
Japanese science fiction action films
2015 science fiction action films
Films based on Japanese novels
Films directed by Takahisa Zeze
Nippon TV films